Branchinella alachua is a species of crustacean in the family Thamnocephalidae. It was described in 1953 by Ralph W. Dexter based on material collected in 1947 by I. J. Cantrall; 11 male individuals of the new species were discovered among Cantrall's collection of Streptocephalus seali. B. alachua is only known from the type locality, a temporary pool in Alachua County, Florida, from which its specific epithet derives. It is listed as an endangered species on the IUCN Red List.

References

Branchiopoda
Freshwater crustaceans of North America
Endemic fauna of Florida
Alachua County, Florida
Crustaceans described in  1953
Taxonomy articles created by Polbot